The 2016 Oregon gubernatorial special election took place on November 8, 2016, to elect the Governor of Oregon, concurrently with the 2016 U.S. presidential election, as well as elections for the U.S. Senate and U.S. House of Representatives, other gubernatorial elections and various state and local elections.

The election determined who would fill the remaining two years of the term of Democratic governor John Kitzhaber, who was re-elected in 2014 and resigned in February 2015. Incumbent Democratic governor Kate Brown, who as Oregon Secretary of State succeeded to the governorship, ran for election to the office. In primary elections held on May 17, Brown easily captured the Democratic nomination, and the Republicans picked Salem oncologist Bud Pierce.

Brown won the election and became the first openly LGBT person elected to a term as governor in U.S. history.

Democratic primary

Candidates

Declared
 Julian Bell, critical care and pulmonary medicine specialist
 Kate Brown, incumbent governor
 Chet Chance, professional driver
 Kevin M. Forsythe, Walmart employee
 Steve Johnson, health worker
 Dave Stauffer, environmental engineer

Declined
 Brad Avakian, State Labor Commissioner (running for secretary of state)
 Tina Kotek, Speaker of the Oregon House of Representatives
 Ted Wheeler, state treasurer (running for Mayor of Portland)

Results

Republican primary

Candidates

Declared
 Allen Alley, former chairman of the Oregon Republican Party, nominee for Oregon State Treasurer in 2008 and candidate for governor in 2010
 Bruce Cuff, real estate broker and candidate for governor in 2014
 Bob Forthan, perennial candidate
 Bob Niemeyer, engineering company owner and candidate for OR-01 in 2014
 Bud Pierce, physician

Declined
 Shane Bemis, Mayor of Gresham
 Knute Buehler, state representative and nominee for secretary of state in 2012
 Sid Leiken, Lane County Commissioner, former mayor of Springfield and candidate for Oregon's 4th congressional district in 2010 (running for secretary of state)
 Julie Parrish, state representative
 Dennis Richardson, former state representative and nominee for governor in 2014 (running for secretary of state)
 Sherrie Sprenger, state representative
 Monica Wehby, pediatric neurosurgeon and nominee for the U.S. Senate in 2014

Polling

Results

Independent Party primary
The Independent Party of Oregon officially qualified as a major party on August 17, 2015.

Candidates

Declared
 Patrick Barney
 Cliff Thomason, realtor

Declined
 Betsy Johnson, Democratic state senator

Results

Minor parties
 Aaron Donald Auer (Constitution Party), candidate for governor in 2014
 James Foster (Libertarian Party), candidate for OR-01 in 2014

General election

Debates
Complete video of debate, October 13, 2016 - C-SPAN
Complete video of debate, October 20, 2016 - C-SPAN

Predictions

Polling

Aggregate polls

→ Indicates an internal poll conducted on behalf of Bud Pierce.

with Allen Alley

with Shane Bemis

with Dennis Richardson

Results

Results by congressional district
Brown won 3 of the state's 5 congressional districts, including the swingy  held by Peter DeFazio, which he represents heavily democratic Benton County and Lane County, both college towns, and the strongly Republican south coastal counties.

Notes

References

External links
Nominees
 Aaron Donald Auer (C) for Governor
 Kate Brown (D) for Governor
 James Foster (L) for Governor
 Bud Pierce (R) for Governor
 Cliff Thomason (I) for Governor

Primary candidates
 Julian Bell (D) for Governor
 Steve Johnson (D) for Governor
 Chet Chance (D) for Governor
 Allen Alley (R) for Governor
 Bob Niemeyer (R) for Governor
 Patrick Barney (I) for Governor

2016
Oregon
LGBT history in Oregon
Gubernatorial
Gubernatorial 2016
Oregon 2016
2016 in LGBT history